"Hurry Up Harry" is a song by English band Sham 69 was released in October 1978, which came from their second studio album That's Life. The single was backed by the B-side "No Entry". It reached number 10 on the UK Singles Chart for 8 weeks . The song was on their 1980 compilation album The First, the Best and the Last and 1989 live album The Complete Sham 69 Live. They appeared on the BBC television show Top of the Pops and performed "Hurry Up Harry".

In 2006, the single "Hurry Up England"  was released as an alternative football anthem for England's entry in the 2006 FIFA World Cup, featuring samples from the original.

Track listing 
Side one
 "Hurry Up Harry"

Side two
 "No Entry"

Chart performances

References 

1978 singles
Sham 69 songs
Polydor Records singles
1978 songs
Songs written by Dave Guy Parsons
Songs written by Jimmy Pursey